Monica Birkenes, better known by her stage name Mr Little Jeans, is a Norwegian singer-songwriter living in Los Angeles, California. She has released two studio albums: Pocketknife, in 2014 and Better Days in 2022.

The pseudonym Mr Little Jeans is inspired by Kumar Pallana's character in Wes Anderson's film Rushmore.

Early life 
Birkenes grew up in rural Grimstad, Norway, the daughter of a shipbuilder and a secretary. In her youth, she performed in town plays and musical events, as well as church choirs and retirement homes. At age 18, she moved to London to study drama, while serving tables to make ends meet.

Music career 
After signing to independent label Neon Gold, Birkenes released her first single, "Rescue Song", in 2010. The Guardian compared her sound at the time to Lykke Li, Robyn, and Annie. Later that year, she put out her first EP, titled Angel Birkenes grew in popularity with her 2011 cover of Arcade Fire's "The Suburbs". She often collaborates with Los Angeles producer Tim Anderson, who was instrumental in creating her debut album, Pocketknife. The record was released on Harvest Records on 25 March 2014.

Discography

Studio albums

Extended plays

Singles

Guest appearances

References

External links 
 

People from Grimstad
Norwegian singer-songwriters
Date of birth missing (living people)
Norwegian expatriates in the United States
Living people
Year of birth missing (living people)
Nettwerk Music Group artists
Harvest Records artists